Leanne Trimboli (born 10 November 1975) is an Australian former soccer goalkeeper who played three matches for the Australia women's national soccer team. She was a member of the Australian team at the 2000 Summer Olympics, but did not play.

See also
 Australia at the 2000 Summer Olympics

References

External links
 

1975 births
Living people
Australian women's soccer players
Place of birth missing (living people)
Footballers at the 2000 Summer Olympics
Olympic soccer players of Australia
Women's association football goalkeepers
Australia women's international soccer players